Starjet may refer to:

Lockheed L-133 Starjet, plane
Starjet, List of defunct airlines of the United Arab Emirates 
The Starjets, late 1970s power pop/group from Belfast, Northern Ireland
Fully Integrated Robotised Engine, unit frequently referred to as the "Starjet" engine
GeminiJets  (Redirected from StarJets)